Canning House is a British not-for profit and non-governmental organisation dedicated to the discussion of social, political and economic affairs across the region of Latin America through research and debate.
Founded in 1943, Canning House serves as a forum for debate and discussion of the current affairs of the region.

History
Canning House is named after George Canning (1770–1827), British Foreign Secretary between 1807–1809 and 1822–1827, and briefly Prime Minister in 1827. Canning was a prominent advocate of the emerging republics in early Latin America, and is a recognized figure in the region with several streets bearing his name.
Canning House first came into being in 1943 with the creation of the Hispanic Council and the Luso-Brazilian Council simultaneously. Following the end of the Second World War, both councils were merged, and the resulting entity was commonly referred to as Canning House. In 1973 the Hispanic and Luso-Brazilian Council was registered as a limited company, and in 1997 Canning House was set up as a wholly owned subsidiary. Initial meetings took place at the Shell-Mex House before offices were set up in Berkeley Street in 1947. From 1953 until 2018, Canning House was based in Belgrave Square before moving to 126 Wigmore Street, where it can be found today.
In July 2022, Jeremy Browne, a former British Minister of State for Latin America, among other regions, became Canning House's Chief Executive.

Focus areas
Canning House has a number of areas including Trade & Investment, Government & Policy, Education, Research and Culture.

In the area of Trade & Investment, Canning House takes an active role in encouraging links between the UK and Latin America. It holds many events each year discussing the opportunities available across different sectors and informing British businesses about the Latin American market. This ranges from hosting trade missions from countries such as Bolivia, to holding conferences on the Biofuel industry in Latin America, as well as smaller, focused policy roundtables with key figures from selected industries.

Since 2020, Canning House has authored an annual report titled LatAm Outlook. The report examines the six largest economies of the region (Argentina, Brazil, Chile, Colombia, Mexico and Peru) through lenses of Politics, Economics, Security and Corruption, Society, Health and the Environment, and makes some predictions as to how the following five years will play out. 

Canning House has served as secretariat for the All-Party Parliamentary Group (APPG) meetings on Latin America since 2015, and has contributed to parliamentary papers examining the UK's relationship with Latin American nations.
Each year Canning House holds the Canning Lecture, a series of lectures presented by visiting heads of state in which they offer their perspective on UK–Latin America relations and explore possible avenues for cooperation in the future. Previous figures to have given lectures include former President of Chile Michelle Bachelet, the President of Colombia Ivan Duque, and former President of Brazil Fernando Henrique Cardoso.
In 2010, then-Foreign Secretary William Hague became the first British Foreign Secretary to give the Canning Lecture, renamed in that year as the Canning Agenda. In it, he set out the government's foreign policy agenda with a renewed focus on Latin America, outlining a desire to increase trade and encourage British businesses to explore the region in the context of an increasingly globalized world economy.

Canning House has strong links with a range of educational institutions across the UK. It has partnered with the Latin America and Caribbean Centre at the London School of Economics to create the Canning House Research Forum, a "multi-year rolling programme of research and policy engagement around the overarching theme of 'The Future of Latin America and the Caribbean' with particular reference to UK-–Latin America relations". 
The Canning House Library Collection, a collection of 54,000 works covering a broad range of subject areas concerning the Hispanic and Lusophone countries of the world, now resides in King's College London having been gifted to the university in 2012. It was originally housed inside Canning House from its creation in 1943.

As well as its weekly newsletters which include a summary of current affairs news from the region and are distributed to members, Canning House produces a number of reports each year for its members called 'Canning Papers'. These reports focus on a particular topic and include the latest research and data available and aim to inform members of the latest developments in the region.

Structure
Canning House operates a membership system that includes both Individual and Corporate membership offerings. Individual and Public members are given access to Canning House newsletters, Canning Insights and to Geopolitical, Cultural, Flagship and Business, Trade and Investment events at a discount, while corporate members have full access to all Canning House events and publications

References

External links
Official Website
The Hispanic and Luso-Brazilian Council at Open Charities

Charities based in London